The 1999–2000 Eastern Illinois Panthers men's basketball team represented the Eastern Illinois University during the 1999–2000 NCAA Division I men's basketball season. This was Rick Samuels' 20th season as head coach at Eastern Illinois.

Guard Kyle Hill was leading scorer, averaging 19.1 points per game, junior forward Merve Joseph with 7.3 rebounds per games.

Schedule

|-
!colspan=9 style=| Ohio Valley tournament

References 

Eastern Illinois Panthers men's basketball seasons
Eastern Illinois Panthers men's basketball
Eastern Illinois Panthers men's basketball
1999–2000 Ohio Valley Conference men's basketball season